Martha Foster may refer to:

Madame Foster, Martha "Madame" Foster, fictional character in the animated television series Foster's Home for Imaginary Friends
Martha M. Foster, founder and executive director of Living Earth Television
Martha Foster, character in Alias Nick Beal